Statistics of Nadeshiko League in the 2010 season. NTV Beleza won the championship.

As of 2010, by the reformation announced in November 2009, Division 1 and Division 2 was renamed as Nadeshiko League and Challenge League respectively. Also, the number of participating teams became 10 teams for Nadeshiko League from 8, and 12 teams for Challenge League, from 8, dividing into 2 sections of 6 teams.

Nadeshiko League (Division 1)

Result

League awards

Best player

Top scorers

Best eleven

Best young player

Challenge League (Division 2)

Result

East

West

Promotion/relegation series

Division 1 promotion/relegation series

Qualifiers 

 Speranza F.C. Takatsuki play to Division 1 promotion/relegation Series Final.

Final 

 Iga F.C. Kunoichi Stay Division 1 in 2011 Season.
 Speranza F.C. Takatsuki Stay Division 2 in 2011 Season.

Division 2 promotion/relegation series

Qualifiers 

 F.C. Takahashi Charme, Sfida Setagaya F.C. play to Division 2 promotion/relegation Series Final.

Final 

 F.C. Takahashi Charme, Sfida Setagaya F.C. Promoted for Division 2 in 2011 Season.
 Shimizudaihachi Pleiades Relegated to Regional League (Tokai League) in 2011 Season.
 Renaissance Kumamoto F.C. Relegated to Regional League (Kyushu, Q League) in 2011 Season.

See also 
 Empress's Cup

References

External links 
  Nadeshiko League Official Site
 Season at soccerway.com

Nadeshiko League seasons
1
L
Japan
Japan